Hernán Masanés (2 October 1931 – 8 August 2018) was a Chilean cyclist. He competed at the 1952 and 1956 Summer Olympics.

References

External links
 

1931 births
2018 deaths
Chilean male cyclists
Olympic cyclists of Chile
Cyclists at the 1952 Summer Olympics
Cyclists at the 1956 Summer Olympics
Pan American Games medalists in cycling
20th-century Chilean people
21st-century Chilean people
Pan American Games silver medalists for Chile
Medalists at the 1951 Pan American Games